Janelidze, Djanelidze or Dzhanelidze (Georgian: ჯანელიძე) is a Georgian surname that may refer to the following people:
 Alexander Janelidze (1888–1975), Georgian geologist and statesman
Davit Janelidze (born 1973), Georgian football player 
Giorgi Janelidze (born 1989), Georgian football midfielder
Mikheil Janelidze (born 1981), former Vice Prime Minister of Georgia
Mindia Janelidze (born 1978), Georgian Minister of Defense
Nana Janelidze (born 1955), Georgian film director and screenwriter
Yustin Djanelidze (1883–1950), Soviet cardiac surgeon pioneer

Georgian-language surnames